Claudio Gilberto Froehlich (born 10 June 1927) is a Brazilian zoologist.

Life
Froehlich was born in 1927 in São Paulo, Brazil. In 1951 he started his doctoral studies at the Universidade de São Paulo together with Eudóxia Maria de Oliveira Pinto, who later would become his wife. They both had Ernst Marcus as their advisor. Marcus suggested that they should work on the taxonomy of land planarians since it was a poorly studied but highly diverse group in the region. Later, in 1960, he received his post-doctoral degree from Lund University.

After his first academic years studying land planarians, Froehlich started to work with freshwater invertebrates, especially stoneflies.

Homages 
The beetle genus Claudiella Reichard & Vanin, 1976 and the stonefly genus Claudioperla Illies, 1963 were named after him.

Selected works

References 

1927 births
Brazilian zoologists
Academic staff of the University of São Paulo
Living people